The União dos Escoteiros do Brasil (UEB, Union of Brazilian Scouts) is the national Scouting organization of Brazil. Scouting in Brazil was founded in 1910 and was among the charter members of the World Organization of the Scout Movement in 1922. The União dos Escoteiros do Brasil itself was founded in 1924; it has 53,055 members as of 2011. The association is a member of the Comunidade do Escutismo Lusófono (Community of Lusophone Scouting).

Scouting in Brazil is very popular in cities and suburban areas. Scouts from Brazil attend world and regional events in large numbers. They were well represented at the 1998 World Jamboree with 3,000 participants.

Program

The association is divided in four sections according to age:
 Lobinhos/Lobinhas (Cub Scouts) - ages 7 to 10 - The highest rank is the Distintivo de Cruzeiro do Sul
 Escoteiros/Escoteiras (Boy Scouts/Girl Scouts) - ages 11 to 14 - The highest rank is the Distintivo de Escoteiro Lis de Ouro
 Seniores/Guias (Senior Scouts/Girl Guides) - ages 15 to 17 - The highest rank is the "Distintivo de Escoteiro da Pátria"
 Pioneiros/Pioneiras (Pioneers) - ages 18 to 21 - The highest rank is the Insígnia de B-P

The UEB also has Sea Scout and Air Scout branches.

The Scout emblem incorporates elements of the coat of arms of Brazil.

Scout Motto

 Scouts: Sempre Alerta (Be Prepared)
 Cubs: Melhor Possivel (Do your best)

The Scout slogan is Estar sempre alerta para servir o melhor possível.

Scout Promise
Prometo pela minha honra fazer o melhor possível para:Cumprir meus deveres para com Deus e minha Pátria;Ajudar ao próximo em toda e qualquer ocasião;Obedecer a Lei Escoteira.

I promise on my honor, to do my best:To fulfill my duties to God and to my country;To help my fellow man in any occasion;To obey the Scout Law.

Scout Law
 O Escoteiro é honrado e digno de confiança.A Scout is honorable and trustworthy.
 O Escoteiro é leal.A Scout is loyal.
 O Escoteiro está sempre alerta para ajudar o próximo e pratica diariamente uma boa ação.A Scout is always prepared to help his fellow man and practices a good turn every day.
 O Escoteiro é amigo de todos e irmão dos demais Escoteiros.A Scout is a friend to everybody and a brother to every other Scout.
 O Escoteiro é cortês.A Scout is courteous.
 O Escoteiro é bom para os animais e as plantas.A Scout is good to animals and plants.
 O Escoteiro é obediente e disciplinado.A Scout is obedient and orderly.
 O Escoteiro é alegre e sorri nas dificuldades.A Scout is happy and smiles in difficulties.
 O Escoteiro é econômico e respeita o bem alheio.A Scout is thrifty and respects the property of others.
 O Escoteiro é limpo de corpo e alma.A Scout is clean in body and soul.

See also
 Federação de Bandeirantes do Brasil
 Caio Vianna Martins
 Oscar Palmquist

References

External links
 Official Homepage

World Organization of the Scout Movement member organizations
Scouting and Guiding in Brazil
Youth organizations established in 1924
1924 establishments in Brazil